Kenneth Sylvester Hogan (October 9, 1902 – January 2, 1980) was an outfielder in Major League Baseball outfielder who played for the Cincinnati Reds (1921) and the Cleveland Indians (1923–1924).

External links

1902 births
1980 deaths
Major League Baseball outfielders
Cincinnati Reds players
Cleveland Indians players
Akron Tyrites players
Canton Terriers players
Erie Sailors players
Fort Wayne Chiefs players
Toronto Maple Leafs (International League) players
Baseball players from Cleveland